The Aretamma Temple (also known as Arvetamma) is a Hindu temple in Veguru Village, Kovur Mandal, Nellore, Andhra Pradesh, India.

Aretamma is worshiped as Grama devata (Goddess who protects Veguru village). She was born in a brahamana house. When counting rice one stone found in rice bag the stone called Aretamma. One day she said to him brahamana person build my temple in this village to place me on that temple.

The temple was reconstructed in 2007 and that time did the thiranalu of aretamma in 3 days grandly. Again after 7 long years did the aretamma thiranalu on 14 June 2015 successfully.

Aretamma Carnival (జాతర)

Gallery

Hindu temples in Nellore district
12th-century Hindu temples
Devi temples in Andhra Pradesh